HMS Scylla was a wooden screw corvette launched at Sheerness Dockyard in 1856 and sold for breakup in 1882. She served in the Mediterranean from 1859 to 1863 and China from 1863 to 1867. In 1869 she joined the Flying Squadron, and then she was then deployed to the Pacific until 1873. She was broken up in 1882.

References

External links 
 

1856 ships
Pearl-class corvettes
Ships built in Sheerness